Nearctodesmidae is a family of flat-backed millipedes in the order Polydesmida. There are about 7 genera and 17 described species in Nearctodesmidae.

Genera
 Bistolodesmus Shelley, 1994
 Ergodesmus Chamberlin, 1949
 Harpogonopus
 Kepolydesmus Chamberlin, 1910
 Leonardesmus
 Nearctodesmus Silvestri, 1910
 Sakophallus Chamberlin, 1942

References

Further reading

 
 
 
 

Polydesmida
Millipede families